Rat running (also known as rodent running, cut-through driving, or dive-bombing) is the practice by motorists of using residential side streets or any unintended short cut such as a parking lot, delivery service lane or cemetery road instead of the intended main road in urban or suburban areas.

Background
Rat running is a tactic used to avoid heavy traffic and long delays at traffic signals or other obstacles, even where there are traffic calming measures to discourage its use or laws against taking certain routes. Rat runs are frequently taken by motorists familiar with the local geography.

Rat running is controversial. When traffic is especially heavy on a highway or main road, rat-running vehicles may cause another traffic jam on the rat-run streets, along with accompanying problems such as collisions, pollution from exhaust, and road rage. It is sometimes opposed by residents on the affected streets, as they may regard it as a disturbance of their peace. Sometimes, it causes "house price fears". Authorities may try to prevent rat running by installing traffic calming devices, such as speed humps, traffic circles, and rumble strips, by making some streets one-way, or by blocking off certain intersections. Some places, including Montgomery County, Maryland; Maryland Heights, Missouri; and parts of Minneapolis, Minnesota, have banned turning onto certain streets during rush hours to prevent rat running.

Common strategies

Side-street usage
Motorists familiar with an area sometimes use side streets or other smaller roads that run parallel to the main road. They are generally local people who know these streets and the pros and cons of using them as alternatives to the main road. Use of satellite navigation apps with real-time traffic information can also be used by motorists unfamiliar with an area to route around congested main roads via side streets.

Red light avoidance
In some places, motorists avoid stopping at a red light by turning onto a side street or into a parking lot to bypass it.

In some countries, red lights can be avoided by turning right on red (or left in drive-on-the-left countries), making a U-turn, and then turning right (or left) again back on to the street on which the motorist was traveling. This may require less time than waiting for the light to turn green.

Traffic jam avoidance
Some motorists exit and then re-enter a freeway or motorway at the same junction, or use lanes designated for exiting and merging, or cut across unpaved dividers to frontage roads, to pass stationary traffic.

Some large streets are separated from parallel small residential streets only by a small strip where homeowners park their vehicles. These streets can be used to bypass traffic jams.

Prevention and minimization

Many communities combat rat running by installing traffic calming features such as chicanes, speed tables, speed cushions, curb extensions, cobbled sections, hidden law enforcement and various other measures. Other communities install physical barriers that completely block through-traffic along routes prone to rat running.

One of the most extensive uses of this strategy is found in Berkeley, California, where dozens of concrete barriers throughout the city block shortcuts, while still allowing cycling. In Northern Virginia, shortcuts are discouraged by the construction of dead end streets, communities with no outlet, and winding roads designed to confuse, making navigation through the neighborhoods more difficult and time-consuming.

The Netherlands make extensive use of raising bollards to eliminate through traffic while allowing pedestrians, cyclists, residents and local businesses to get through.

Some US cities (such as St. Louis) make extensive use of mid-block barriers across residential streets, such as rows of planters, curbs, or gates, designed to block the passage of vehicles while simultaneously allowing pedestrians through. This serves to deter rat-running while maintaining a sense of continuity for pedestrians, making the streets more pedestrian-friendly. 

As of the 21st century, officials in a number of US states including Georgia and Maryland, some smaller US jurisdictions, and some parts of the United Kingdom have passed or tried to pass laws restricting rat-running in certain communities to maintain peace and privacy for residents.

When a major event draws a large volume of traffic, local police sometimes monitor or block secondary roads to prevent motorists from the event crowd from using such streets to avoid the traffic.

In the United Kingdom, the Low Traffic Neighbourhood scheme is intended to discourage rat-running though certain residential areas, using a combination of filtered permeability (for example, using barriers, planters or other modal filters) and traffic calming measures.

See also

Energy-efficient driving ("Hypermiling")
Shunpiking
Braess's paradox

References

Road transport
Driving techniques